Dr. Alan L. Steinberg is an American author. He wrote the libretto for the opera The Falcon and the Sailor Boy, which was performed at SUNY Potsdam in 2006, starring Stephanie Blythe.

Education and career
Steinberg received his PhD from Carnegie Mellon University, and is a Professor in SUNY Potsdam's English department, where he also serves as the coordinator of the writing program. Steinberg has previously taught at Paul Smith's College, Marist College and Idaho State University.

Works

Alan Steinberg has published the following works of fiction:

 The Night Before the Morning After (Radio Play)
 The Road to Corinth (Stage Play)
 Divided: A Collection of Fiction (Fiction Collection)
 Cry of the Leopard (Novel)
 Fathering (Poetry Collection)
Steinberg has published numerous other short works and essays in various journals.

Steinberg was the librettist, with composer Paul Siskind, of the opera The Sailor-Boy and the Falcon, which premiered in 2006.

References

External links
 Books by Alan Steinberg from BookFinder

20th-century American novelists
American male novelists
Living people
Idaho State University faculty
Carnegie Mellon University alumni
State University of New York at Potsdam faculty
Paul Smith's College faculty
Marist College faculty
Novelists from New York (state)
Year of birth missing (living people)
20th-century American male writers